Maj. John Hammond Fordham House is a historic home located in Orangeburg, Orangeburg County, South Carolina. It was built in 1903, and is a 1½-story, Victorian frame cottage. It was the home of Maj. John Hammond Fordham, a prominent African-American citizen of Orangeburg.

It was added to the National Register of Historic Places in 1985.

References

African-American history of South Carolina
Houses on the National Register of Historic Places in South Carolina
Victorian architecture in South Carolina
Houses completed in 1903
Houses in Orangeburg County, South Carolina
National Register of Historic Places in Orangeburg County, South Carolina